The Colorado School of Public Health is an accredited, collaborative school of public health representing three Colorado public educational and research institutions: the University of Colorado, Colorado State University and the University of Northern Colorado.  The school is accredited by the Council on Education for Public Health. The school operates on three university campuses: the University of Colorado Anschutz Medical Campus in Aurora, Colo., Colorado State University in Fort Collins, Colo. and the University of Northern Colorado in Greeley, Colo.

History 

The school officially opened on July 1, 2008, following decades of dedicated development. Planning for the school was initiated by a partnership of public health practitioners, academics, and business leaders. The partnership formed an official taskforce in 2002 in order to develop a strategic plan and seek the funding necessary to open a school of public health. The task force was successful and instrumental in the decision to open the school as a collaboration. In August 2007, each university president or chancellor signed a memorandum of agreement to open the school and the founding dean was appointed that December. Within months the school admitted its first class of students, setting the stage for growth future development. Among those developments, the school received full accreditation from the Council on Education for Public Health October 2010, and was reaccredited in September 2015.

Today the school enrolls nearly 600 students, with over 200 full-time faculty across the three university campuses, and more than 2,600 alumni. Each day the school finds new and innovative ways to expand its work, build partnerships and achieve the goal of a healthier region and world.

In 2018, the Colorado School of Public Health (ColoradoSPH) celebrated its 10th anniversary.

Deans 

 Richard F. Hamman, MD, DrPH (Founding Dean, December 2007 – December 2010)
 Judith Albino, PhD (Interim Dean, January 2011 – May 2012)
 David C. Goff, Jr, MD, PhD (June 2012 – November 2016)
 Elaine Morrato, DrPH, MPH, CPH (Interim Dean, December 2016 - September 2017)
 Jonathan M. Samet, MD, MS (October 2017 – Present)

Departments and Programs 

The Colorado School of Public Health is home to five academic departments and multiple programs, with 18 concentration areas.

Biostatistics and Informatics 
Chair: Debashis Ghosh, PhD

Programs: Master of Public Health, Master of Science and Doctor of Philosophy

Community and Behavioral Health 
Chair: Jennifer Leiferman, PhD

Programs: Master of Public Health and Doctor of Public Health

Environmental and Occupational Health 
Interim Chair: Lee Newman, MD, MA   

Programs: Master of Public Health and Doctor of Public Health

Epidemiology 
Chair: Jill Norris, PhD 

Programs: Master of Public Health, Master of Science, Doctor of Public Health, and Doctor of Philosophy

Health Systems, Management and Policy 
Chair: Glen Mays, PhD

Programs: Master of Public Health, Master of Science and Doctor of Philosophy

Centers 
Center for Global Health (WHO); Center for Public Health Practice | Rocky Mountain Public Health Training Center (HRSA); Centers for American Indian & Alaska Native Health; Latino Research & Policy Center; Center for Health, Work & Environment (NIOSH); Rocky Mountain Prevention & Research Center (CDC); Center for Food Safety & the Prevention of Foodborne Disease (CDC); Center for Innovative Design & Analysis; Lifecourse Epidemiology of Adiposity & Diabetes Center; Injury & Violence Prevention Center

Notes

External links
Colorado School of Public Health
Application Information
Academic Departments

Colorado State University
University of Northern Colorado
Schools of public health in the United States
Educational institutions established in 2008
Medical and health organizations based in Colorado
2008 establishments in Colorado